Polina Petrova (born April 1, 1971 in Minsk) is a Belarusian female curler.

She played on two World Mixed Championships (2015, 2017), one World Mixed Doubles Championship (2016) and one European Championship (C division, 2018).

Achievements
Belarusian Mixed Curling Championship: gold (2017), bronze (2016, 2018).
Belarusian Mixed Doubles Curling Championship: gold (2015), silver (2019).

Teams and events

Women's

Mixed

Mixed doubles

References

External links
 

1971 births
Living people
Belarusian female curlers
Belarusian curling champions
Sportspeople from Minsk